T.P. Seetharam is an Indian Civil servant and was the Indian ambassador to United Arab Emirates.

Positions held
High Commissioner of India to Mauritius.

Indian Foreign Service
He is a 1980 batch officer of the Indian Foreign Service.

Indian Ambassadors to United Arab Emirates

External links
T.P. Seetharam Ambassador of India to the UAE

References

High Commissioners of India to Mauritius
Indian Foreign Service officers
Ambassadors of India to the United Arab Emirates